Ficus papyratia is a species of sea snail, a marine gastropod mollusk in the family Ficidae, the fig shells.

Subspecies
Ficus papyratia carolae Clench, 1945
Ficus papyratia lindae Petuch, 1988
Ficus papyratia papyratia (Say, 1822) 
Ficus papyratia villai Petuch, 1998

Description

Distribution

References

External links

Ficidae
Gastropods described in 1822